Władysław Król (30 October 1907 – 29 January 1991), was a Polish ice hockey and football player and coach. He played for ŁKS Łódź in both sports during his career. Internationally he played four games for the Poland national football team, and with the Poland national ice hockey team at the 1936 Winter Olympics, as well as the 1938 World Championship. After his playing career he turned to coaching, remaining with the ŁKS Łódź football club, whom he managed at various times from 1939 until 1966.

Since 2021, he has been the patron of the ŁKS Municipal Stadium.

References

External links
 

1907 births
1991 deaths
Association footballers not categorized by position
Ice hockey players at the 1936 Winter Olympics
ŁKS Łódź managers
ŁKS Łódź players
Olympic ice hockey players of Poland
People from Łęczna County
People from Lublin Governorate
Poland international footballers
Polish football managers
Polish footballers
Polish ice hockey forwards
Sportspeople from Lublin Voivodeship